Acrobasis getuliella is a species of snout moth in the genus Acrobasis. It was described by Zerny in 1914. It is found in Croatia and on Sicily and Cyprus.

References

Moths described in 1914
Acrobasis
Moths of Europe